The National Resistance Association of Literary and Art Workers was an organization founded on 27 March 1938 to unite cultural workers in China against the Japanese invaders during the Second Sino-Japanese War. It was led by the politically neutral writer Lao She and membership ranged from 100 to 400 writers during the years of the organization's existence. Notable members included Mao Dun, Ding Ling, Ba Jin, Lin Yutang, Shi Zhecun, and many others.

See also 
John Reed Clubs
Proletkult
China Federation of Literary and Art Circles

References 
 Charles A. Laughlin. "The All-China Association of Writers and Artists". In Kirk A. Denton, ed., Literary Societies of Republican China. Lanham: Lexington Books, 2008.

Defunct organizations based in China
Arts organizations established in 1938
Arts organizations based in China